Holden v. Hardy, 169 U.S. 366 (1898), is a United States labor law case in which the Supreme Court of the United States held that a limitation on working time for miners and smelters was constitutional.

Facts
In March 1896, the Utah state legislature passed a law that limited the number of work hours for miners and smelters.

A few months later, Salt Lake County Sheriff Harvey Harden arrested Albert Holden, the owner of Old Jordan Mine, for breaking that law. He charged him with forcing two of his workers to work much longer than eight hours. While Holden admitted to making his workers work longer hours, he also argued that the Utah law was unconstitutional because it prevented individuals from making contracts with each other. In addition, Holden argued that the law prevented him from having both property and liberty without due process. Not only that, the law also singled out managers in the mining industry, preventing them from equal protection of the laws. Well, Holden was found guilty, anyway, and he was fined $50, which he refused to pay so ended up serving a jail sentence of 57 days.

Meanwhile, Holden appealed the case to the Utah Supreme Court, focusing on the part of the Utah Constitution that protected the freedoms of labor. Holden argued the Utah legislature had no right to pass any law restricting how many hours people can work in a day. The Utah Supreme Court disagreed with him, siding with the legislature and explaining that mining and smelting was dangerous, writing “prolonged effort day after day…will produce morbid, noxious, and often deadly effects in the human system.” Therefore, limiting hours of this work was necessary.

Holden then appealed to the U.S. Supreme Court, who agreed to hear oral arguments on October 21, 1897.

Judgment
The Supreme Court, in a majority opinion by Henry Billings Brown, held the Utah law was a legitimate exercise of the police power. Such a law is legitimate if there is indeed a rational basis, supported by facts, for the legislature to believe particular work conditions are dangerous. It distinguishes the case from laws imposing universal maximum hour rules, that were unconstitutional under the Due Process Clause of the Fourteenth Amendment.

See also
US labor law
Lochner v. New York: Similar case denying limited working hours for bakers
List of United States Supreme Court cases, volume 169

References

External links

1898 in United States case law
United States Supreme Court cases
United States Supreme Court cases of the Fuller Court
Working time
Legal history of Utah
United States substantive due process case law
United States labor case law
Mining law and governance
Mining in Utah